Horsfall is a surname. Notable people with the surname include:

Alan Horsfall (1926–2007), English rugby league footballer, played for Leeds and Castleford
Albert Horsfall (born 1941),  Nigerian security chief and prominent nationalist
Alfred Horsfall (1871–1944),  Australian military surgeon
Allan Horsfall (1927–2012), British gay rights campaigner
Basil Arthur Horsfall (1887–1918), British-Ceylonese recipient of the Victoria Cross
Bernard Horsfall (1930–2013), British actor
Charles Horsfall (1776–1846), British politician and Lord Mayor of Liverpool
Dick Horsfall (1920–1981), English cricketer, played for Essex and Glamorgan
Douglas Horsfall (1856–1936), British stockbroker, benefactor and builder of churches
Ewart Horsfall (1892–1974), British Olympic rower 
Frank Horsfall (1906–1971), American physician
George Horsfall (1924–1992), Australian-born footballer, played for Southampton and Southend United
James G. Horsfall (1905–1995), American biologist
John Horsfall (disambiguation), several people
Robert Bruce Horsfall (1869–1948), American wildlife illustrator
Simon Horsfall (born 1976),  English cricketer, played for Staffordshire
St. John Horsfall (1910–1949), British motor racing driver
Thomas Berry Horsfall (1805–1878), British Conservative MP for Liverpool
Thomas Coglan Horsfall (1841–1932), British philanthropist and founder of the Manchester Art Museum 
Tommy Horsfall (born 1951), Scottish footballer, played for Southend United and Cambridge United
William H. Horsfall (1847–1922), American Medal of Honor recipient during the American Civil War
William R. Horsfall (1907–1998), American entomologist

See also
Horsfall baronets, two baronetcies in the United Kingdom and Ireland
Horsfall family, a family notable in Liverpool, UK, especially as builders of churches
Horsfall Stadium, a football stadium located in Bradford, West Yorkshire, England
Horsfall Museum, an art museum, more commonly known as 'The Manchester Art Museum'
Tamm–Horsfall protein